The 2016 Moroccan Throne Cup will be the 60th staging of the Moroccan Throne Cup. The winners will be assured a place for the 2017 CAF Confederation Cup preliminary round.

Olympique Khouribga will enter as the defending champions after winning the 2015 edition.

The 2016 Moroccan Throne Cup Final played at the Stade Sheikh Mohamed Laghdaf in Laayoune, on 18 November 2016. MAS Fez winning their 4th title.

Final phase

Qualified teams
The following teams competed in the 2016 Moroccan Throne Cup.

16 teams of 2015–16 Botola

Chabab Rif Hoceima
Difaâ El Jadidi
FAR Rabat
FUS Rabat
Hassania Agadir
IR Tanger
KAC Kénitra
Kawkab Marrakech
Maghreb Fès
MC Oujda
Moghreb Tétouan
Olympic Safi
Olympique Khouribga
Raja Casablanca
RSB Berkane
Wydad Casablanca

9 teams of 2015–16 GNF 2

Ittihad Khemisset
JS Massira
Olympique Marrakech
Rachad Bernoussi
Racing de Casablanca
Raja Beni Mellal
US Témara
Wydad Témara
Youssoufia Berrechid

6 teams of 2015–16 GNFA 1

Amal Souk Sebt
Fath Wislan Meknes
Hassania Lazari Oujda
Renaissance Martil
Union Sidi Kacem
Union Sportif Amal Tiznit

1 teams of 2015–16 GNFA 2
Club Rajaa Sportive Jadida

Bracket

Round of 16

 1/16th finals of the Moroccan Throne Cup First leg: 10/11/12 June 2016
 1/16th finals of the Moroccan Throne Cup Second leg: 17/18/19 June 2016

Draw of the 2016 Moroccan Throne Cup season

Round of 8

 1/8th finals of the Coupe du Trône First leg: 2-7 September 2016
 1/8th finals of the Coupe du Trône Second leg: 9-10 September 2016

Quarter-finals

 1/4th finals of the Moroccan Throne Cup First leg: 27-28 September 2016
 1/4th finals of the Moroccan Throne Cup Second leg: 1-2 October 2016

Semi-finals

 1/2th finals of the Coupe du Trône First leg: 19 October 2016
 1/2th finals of the Coupe du Trône Second leg: 2 November 2016

Final

See also
2015–16 Botola
2017 CAF Confederation Cup

External links
Fédération Royale Marocaine de Football

Morocco
Coupe
Coupe